= Jardim São Pedro =

Neighborhood in Porto Alegre, Brazil

Coordinates: 22°52′S 43°34′W

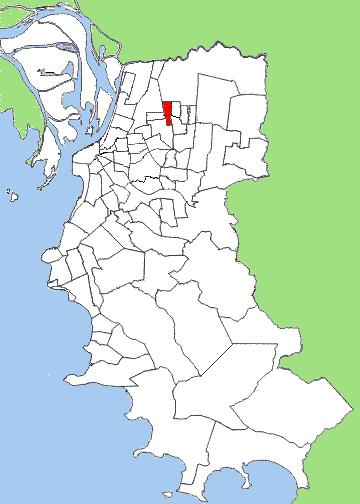

Jardim São Pedro is a neighbourhood (bairro) in the city of Porto Alegre, the state capital of Rio Grande do Sul, in Brazil. It was created by Law 2022 from December 7, 1959, but had its limits modified by Law 4249 from December 27, 1976.
